A school is an institution for learning.

School or the school may also refer to:

 School of thought, a number of individuals with shared styles, approaches or aims
 School (fish), a group of fish swimming in the same direction in a coordinated manner

Education
 School (division), a division of a college or university focused on related subjects
 The School at Columbia University ("The School") The Columbia University primary school

Arts, entertainment, and media

Art
 School of art, not in the educational sense but as a school of thought; an art movement

Music

Groups
 The School (British band)
 The School (Norwegian band)

Songs
 “School”, a song by American rock band Nirvana from their 1989 album Bleach
 "School", a song by British rock band Supertramp from their 1974 album Crime of the Century
"School", a track by Toby Fox from Deltarune Chapter 1 OST from the 2018 video game Deltarune

Television
 School (South Korean TV series) a South Korean anthology series
 School (2011 TV series), a 2011 Japanese serial drama
 The School (Sapphire & Steel), an audio serial based on the TV series Sapphire & Steel

See also
 Old school (disambiguation)
 Scholar (disambiguation)
 Scholastic (disambiguation)
 Scholasticism, a method of learning taught by the academics of medieval universities circa 1100–1500
 Schooled (disambiguation)
 Schooler (disambiguation)
 Schoolies (disambiguation)
 Schooling (disambiguation)
 Types of educational institutions